The Max Reger Art Prize was an art prize of the Bezirk Suhl in the German Democratic Republic. It was awarded annually on 7 October on the occasion of Tag der Republik to personalities from the fields of science and art in the district of Suhl. The prize was named after the composer and conductor Max Reger, who lived in the former residential town of Meiningen from 1911 to 1915 and conducted the Meiningen Court Orchestra there until 1914. This humanistic tradition of the town of Meiningen expired with the German Reunification Treaty in 1990.

The award ceremony used to take place in the Marble Hall of the Elisabethenburg Palace in Meiningen. Among others, the Max Reger Chamber Music Ensemble was engaged for the ceremony. The prize was endowed with 3000 marks of the GDR and consisted of a bronze medal in a leather case as well as a representative leather folder with a certificate. The prize had different classes, including the classes "Literature" and "Theatre".

Laureates 
 Konrad Mann (conductor, pianist) 1962
 Walter Werner (writer) 1962.
 Olaf Koch (conductor) (conductor) 1964
 Werner Schwarz (painter, graphic artist) 1965.
 Wolfgang Hocke (conductor) 1967
 Curt Letsche (writer) 1969
 Fritz Kühn (art smith, sculptor) 1970
 Kurt Baumgarten (painter) 1971
 Günther Hofmann (opera singer and director) for theatre 1975
 Chris Hornbogen (man of letters) 1977.
 Meininger Chorgemeinschaft
 Horst Jäger (author) for Literature 1979
 Joachim Knappe (writer) 1979
 Chamber Orchestra of the Technische Universität Ilmenau 1979
 Landolf Scherzer (writer) 1980
  1985
 Peter Ehrlicher (singer) 1988
 Neuhaus am Rennsteig folk ensemble 1989
 Choir Community Krayenberg

The Max Reger Art Prize is not to be confused with the Main-Franconian Art Prize as a Nazi honour, which was also called the Max Reger Prize.

References 

German art awards
Culture in Meiningen
Awards established in 1962
Awards disestablished in 1990